Salvatore Rebecchini (21 February 1891 – 21 November 1977) was an Italian Christian Democrat politician. He was born in Rome, Kingdom of Italy. He was the 1st mayor of Rome under the Republic. He died in Rome, Italy.

References

1891 births
1977 deaths
20th-century Italian politicians
Christian Democracy (Italy) politicians
Mayors of Rome
Grand Officers of the Order of Merit of the Italian Republic